Aleksander Józef Polus (February 1, 1914 – February 13, 1965) was a Polish boxer who competed in the 1936 Summer Olympics.

He was born in Dortmund, German Empire and died in Poznań.

In 1936, he was eliminated in the quarterfinals of the featherweight class after losing his fight to the eventual gold medalist Oscar Casanovas.

1936 Olympic results
Below is the record of Aleksander Polus, a Polish featherweight boxer who competed at the 1936 Berlin Olympics:

 Round of 32: bye
 Round of 16: bye
 Quarterfinal: lost to Oscar Casanovas (Argentina) on points

External links
profile

1914 births
1965 deaths
Featherweight boxers
Olympic boxers of Poland
Boxers at the 1936 Summer Olympics
Sportspeople from Dortmund
Polish male boxers
20th-century Polish people